, formerly  is a football (soccer) club based in Fukui, the capital city of Fukui Prefecture in Japan. They play in the Hokushinetsu Football League, which is part of Japanese Regional Leagues.

History

Origins (2006–2018) 
The club was born on September 28, 2006 from the merger of FC Kanatsu and Maruoka Phoenix. The name Saurcos comes from the combination of two English words: saur from "dinosaur" and cos from "corps", referring to army corps. It was chosen between three possible choices after a poll between fans, linking also with their mascot, the Fukuiraptor, a dinosaur lived in Japan during the Cretaceous. The logo also presents the Narcissus, a plant typical of this region. The near city of Awara hosts the club's training sessions.

After an immediate promotion from 2nd division of Hokushinetsu Football League, Saurcos Fukui has been in first tier for a decade, waiting for a chance to snatch a spot in Japan Football League. They have participated eight times in the Emperor's Cup, going as far as the second round on four occasions.

Fukui United FC (2019–) 
After the 2018 season, Saurcos Fukui has been dissolved taken by successor of Fukui United FC was founded in 2019 by volunteers from Fukui Prefecture, led by the Fukui Prefectural Football Association, as a company that will take over the Saurcos Fukui management corporation " NPO Fukui J League Team Creation Association " that was disbanded in 2018 due to financial difficulties. It was announced that Kazuo Yoshimura will be appointed as the president of Fukui United Co., Ltd., which will be the operating company, and Junichi Hattori , who was the GM of FC Gifu and V-Varen Nagasaki , will be appointed as the general manager (GM). The club will play their 5th consecutive season at the Hokushinetsu Football League on 2023.

Changes in club name
 2006–2018 : Saurcos Fukui
 2019–present : Fukui United FC

League record

Key
 Pos. = Position in league; P = Games played; W = Games won; D = Games drawn; L = Games lost; F = Goals scored; A = Goals conceded; GD = Goals difference; Pts = Points gained

Honours
Hokushinetsu Football League
Champions (9): 2012, 2013, 2014, 2015, 2017, 2018, 2019, 2020, 2021

Current squad
.

References

External links
Official Site (Japanese)
Official Facebook Page

Football clubs in Japan
Sport in Fukui Prefecture
Fukui (city)
Association football clubs established in 2006
2006 establishments in Japan